Alba María Antonia Cabral Cornero (born 26 June 1947), known as Peggy, is a Dominican journalist, television host, politician and diplomat. Cabral was co-president of the Dominican Revolutionary Party from 2013 to 2020; she also was vice-mayor of the National District (1998–2002). She served as Vice-Minister of Foreign Affairs of the Dominican Republic from 2019 to 2020. She is José Francisco Peña Gómez's widow.

Early life and family 
Peggy is daughter of the Argentine journalist of Spanish descent Alba María Cornero, a native of Rosario, and Dominican writer and diplomat Manuel del Cabral of colonial Spanish and colonial French descent; she was born in Buenos Aires while her father was serving in the Embassy of the Dominican Republic to Argentina.

Cabral comes from a prominent political family in the Dominican Republic, which has had several presidents, including Buenaventura Báez, Ramón Báez, José María Cabral, Marcos Cabral, and Donald Reid-Cabral. Her grandfather,  Mario Fermín Cabral y Báez drafted the bill that in 1935 renamed the Dominican capital, Santo Domingo, for Trujillo City in honor of dictator Rafael Trujillo.

In the late 1950s her father defected to Argentina and received political asylum, where the Cabral family lived for 17 years before returning to the Dominican Republic, except for a sister of Peggy who remained in Argentina.

She married young to Diego Fidel Raúl Degaudenzi Rizzo, an Argentine of Italian descent, with whom she had three children, who have given to them twelve grandchildren. Degaudenzi and Cabral divorced. Cabral remarried on 19 December 1986 to Dominican politician José Francisco Peña Gómez, of whom she's the widow . She studied business administration at the University of Buenos Aires. During her youth she lived in Argentina, Spain, Chile and Brazil.

TV and political career 

En la televisión dominicana ha sido presentadora del programa Conversando con Peggy Cabral, en el que ha entrevistado a destacadas figuras como Hugo Chávez, Benazir Bhutto, Mahmoud Abbas, Fidel Castro, y Michel Martelly.

She was the Dominican Revolutionary Party candidate for the senate seat of the San Cristóbal province to the congressional elections in 2010, she got 41.07% of the votes, being defeated by the incumbent Tommy Galán.

In August 2013, she was designated acting president of the Dominican Revolutionary Party.

In late 2015, Cabral was appointed Dominican Republic ambassador to Italy.

Awards and honours

She has received several awards throughout her life, including:
 Llaves de la ciudad de Paterson, New Jersey
 Medalla al Mérito en el Renglón Político, impuesta por el entonces presidente de la República Dominicana, Hipólito Mejía
 Orden de Don José Solano y Bote (Venezuela)
 Huésped de Honor de las ciudades de La Plata y Rosario (Argentina)
 Personaje del año 2003 (Movimiento Cultural Dominicano)

References

External links 
 

1947 births
Living people
People from Buenos Aires
Descendants of Buenaventura Báez
University of Buenos Aires alumni
Dominican Republic women journalists
Dominican Revolutionary Party politicians
Political office-holders in the Dominican Republic
Presidents of political parties in the Dominican Republic
Ambassadors of the Dominican Republic to Italy
Dominican Republic people of Argentine descent
Dominican Republic people of Basque descent
Dominican Republic people of Canarian descent
Dominican Republic people of Catalan descent
Dominican Republic people of Italian descent
Dominican Republic people of French descent
Dominican Republic people of Galician descent
Dominican Republic people of Portuguese descent
Dominican Republic women ambassadors
White Dominicans